Provincial Assembly is a legislative body in the provinces and regions of Pakistan. All of the 4 Provinces and 2 Autonomous regions has unicameral legislature. Only Islamabad is governed directly by the Federal Government of Pakistan and have no legislative body.

Member of Provincial Assembly 

Member of Provincial Assembly is called MPA in Pakistan. Members of Provincial Assembly are elected by elections every 5 years.

Qualification of members 
According to Article 113 of the Constitution, the qualifications for membership in the National Assembly set forth in Article 62 of the Constitution also apply for membership to the Provincial Assembly. Thus, a member of the Provincial Assembly:

 "must be a citizen of Pakistan;
 "must be at least twenty-five years of age and must be enrolled as a voter in any electoral roll in–
 "any part of Pakistan, for election to a general seat or a seat reserved for non-Muslims; and
 "any area in a Province from which the member seeks membership for election to a seat reserved for women.
 "must be of good character and not commonly known as one who violates Islamic injunctions;
 "must have adequate knowledge of Islamic teachings and practices obligatory duties prescribed by Islam as well as abstains from major sins;
 "must be sagacious, righteous, non-profligate, and honest;
 "must have never been convicted for a crime involving moral turpitude or for giving false evidence;
 "must have never, after the establishment of Pakistan, worked against the integrity of the country or opposed the ideology of Pakistan.

"The disqualifications specified in paragraphs 3 and 4 do not apply to a person who is a non-Muslim, but such a person must have good moral reputation and possess other qualifications prescribed by an act of Parliament."

Current Provincial & Legislative Assemblies

Former Provincial Assemblies

References

External links 
 Provincial Assembly of Balochistan
 Provincial Assembly of Sindh
 Provincial Assembly of Khyber-Pakhtunkhwa
 Provincial Assembly of the Punjab
 https://gba.gov.pk/brief-history/
 https://ajkassembly.gok.pk/about-azad-jammu-kashmir/